Walter Battiste (born Worksop, 11 June 1892, died Windermere, 25 December 1965) was an English footballer who played professionally for Grimsby Town, Millwall and most notably for Gillingham, where he made over 150 Football League appearances.

References

1892 births
1965 deaths
Footballers from Worksop
English footballers
Worksop Town F.C. players
Shirebrook Miners Welfare F.C. players
Grimsby Town F.C. players
Gillingham F.C. players
Millwall F.C. players
Sittingbourne F.C. players
K Sports F.C. players
Association football outside forwards